Eicks is a village belonging to the town of Mechernich in the district of Euskirchen in the south of the state of North Rhine-Westphalia, Germany. It is located near the "Nationalpark Nordeifel" in the Eifel hills, approx. 15 km south-west of Euskirchen and 56 km from Cologne.

References

Villages in North Rhine-Westphalia